Kang Soo-yeon (August 18, 1966 – May 7, 2022) was a South Korean actress. An internationally acclaimed star from the mid-1980s to the end of the 1990s, she is often honorifically nicknamed Korea's "first world star".

Kang began her acting career as a child and gained national recognition with A High School Student's Diary on KBS 1TV (1983–1984), and the comedy films Whale Hunting 2 (1985) and Mimi and Cheolsu's Youth Sketch (1987). However, she would remain unknown outside her country until her breakout role in Im Kwon-taek's The Surrogate Woman (1987). She won the Volpi Cup for Best Actress at the 44th Venice International Film Festival for this role, making her the first Korean actor to receive an award at a major international film festival. In 1989, she received the Bronze St. George at the 16th Moscow International Film Festival for Come Come Come Upward (1989), which further established her "world star" title.

From the early 2000s and onwards however, her output slowed significantly. Kang took years off between film appearances and switched to acting on the small screen, where she achieved moderate success for starring in Ladies of the Palace (2001–02) on SBS TV. Her last film that was released during her lifetime was Juri (2013). After a nine-year gap, she was set to return to film with the Netflix original Jung E, directed by Yeon Sang-ho. The production, which finished filming in January 2022, was released after Kang died, in January 2023.

After collapsing from cerebral hemorrhage at her home in southern Seoul on May 5, 2022, Kang was transported to hospital and stayed in the ICU for recovery. She never awoke from the coma and died on May 7, 2022.

Career
Kang began professionally acting as a child in 1969.

1970s–1991
As a child actress, Kang appeared in a number of low-profile movies and TV shows in the 1970s and 1980s.

Her career breakthrough happened when she took on a lead role as the vulnerable teenager Ok-nyo in the Im Kwon-taek-directed movie The Surrogate Woman. For the film, she was honored with the Volpi Cup for Best Actress award at the 1987 Venice International Film Festival as well as the Best Actress Award at the Nantes International Film Festival. The former achievement marked the first time a Korean actor, female or male, had been given an award at the major film festival. At the time, it was still considered shocking to many that South Korea even had a film industry.

Two years later, Come Come Come Upward, a Buddhist-themed movie also directed by Im, was released. In the film, Kang played the role of Sun-nyeo, a young student who seeks refuge in a monastery to escape from her troubled home; she studies to become a nun and later falls in love. Kang did, in fact, get her head shaved onscreen in the scene when Sun-nyeo becomes a nun. She personally felt proud of her performance—later stating she felt her ego was insignificant to her portrayal and that it was "natural for [Sun-nyeo] to shave her head", due to the character's wish to be a nun. Kang won the Bronze St. George at the 16th Moscow International Film Festival for her role in Come Come Come Upward, establishing further credit as Korea's "world star".

In the same year, she was invited to serve as a juror in the Tokyo International Film Festival. In addition, she later became a member of the jury for the 17th Moscow International Film Festival, in 1991.

1990s
In the 1990s, Kang appeared in a number of movies, the most notable of which are Jang Sun-woo's Road to the Racetrack (1991), That Woman, That Man (1993) by Kim Ui-seok, Lee Myung-se's Their Last Love Affair (1996), and Im Sang-soo's debut, Girls' Night Out (1998). Road to the Racetrack won her several accolades for best actress at award ceremonies, including the Baeksang Arts Awards, Chunsa Film Art Awards, and the Blue Dragon Film Awards. That Woman, That Man was a commercial success at the box office, and she earned another Baeksang Arts Award for Most Popular Actress (her first being in 1990 for her performance in All That Falls Has Wings).

By the end of the decade, Kang had acted in 32 movies. After Rainbow Trout was released in 1999, she cut down her work in film and took to acting on television. The actress was invited to be a juror in the 5th Busan International Film Festival, in 2000.

2000s
After a fifteen-year gap, Kang returned to television in 2001. She was given a starring role in Ladies of the Palace, a historical drama that aired on SBS TV. The 150-episode series was successful, and it managed to garner her renewed visibility among mainstream audiences. Her performance as Jeong Nan-jeong enabled her to win a daesang, awarded by the channel.

After a hiatus from the movie scene, Kang made her comeback by playing the role of an attorney in The Circle. She then appeared in two more movies, Hanbando in 2006 and With a Girl of Black Soil in 2007. Hanbando received largely negative reviews. In 2007, she continued her foray into mainstream TV by acting in the drama miniseries Moonhee on MBC TV. On the show, she played the role of a woman who is forced to leave her child she had when she was only eighteen.

2010s and 2020s
Throughout the 2010s, Kang only appeared in two films, one of which was Im Kwon-taek's Hanji (2011).

In 2015, she became the co-director for the Busan International Film Festival, but left the board two years later.

In 2022, Kang was given a starring role in Yeon Sang-ho's sci-fi action film Jung E, set in the 22nd century. Filming began in November 2021 and concluded in January 2022. Kang played the role of a researcher at an AI lab  who clones the brain of an elite soldier—her mother. The film was released globally on Netflix in January 2023, after Kang's death.

Death
At 5:48 p.m. (KST) on May 5, 2022, Kang was found unconscious at her home in southern Seoul by first responders. They reported that she had suffered a cardiac arrest after collapsing from a cerebral hemorrhage. Immediately, she was transported to the local Gangnam Severance Hospital, where she was admitted to the ICU and became comatose.

After receiving two days of medical treatment at the hospital, Kang died at 3 p.m. on May 7, 2022. She was cremated at Seoul Memorial Park and her ashes were buried at the Honor Stone on May 11, 2022.

Reactions
Jeonju International Film Festival, which incidentally concluded on May 7, 2022, commemorated Kang's legacy through social media, writing: "The Jeonju International Film Festival commemorates the passing of the late actress Kang Soo-yeon, who was a shining star of Korean cinema. I will not forget the legacy she left in the Korean film industry."

Filmography
Source:

Film

Television

Awards and nominations

State honors

See also
 Contemporary culture of South Korea
 List of South Korean actresses

Notes

References and notes

External links
  (in Korean)
 
 
 Kang Soo-yeon's profile (Korean) at epg.epg.co.kr
 Kang Soo-yeon's filmography at movies.nytimes.com

1966 births
2022 deaths
20th-century South Korean actresses
21st-century South Korean actresses
Actresses from Seoul
South Korean Buddhists
South Korean child actresses
South Korean film actresses
South Korean television actresses
Volpi Cup for Best Actress winners
Best Actress Paeksang Arts Award (film) winners